Brake van and guard's van are terms used mainly in the UK, Ireland, Australia and India for a railway vehicle equipped with a hand brake which can be applied by the guard. The equivalent North American term is caboose, but a British brake van and a caboose are very different in appearance, because the former usually has only four wheels, while the latter usually has bogies. German railways employed Brakeman's cabins combined into other cars.

Many British freight trains formerly had no continuous brake so the only available brakes were those on the locomotive and the brake van. The brake van was marshalled at the rear of the train so both portions of the train could be brought to a stand in the event of a coupling breaking.

When freight trains were fitted with continuous braking, brake vans lost their importance, and were discontinued by many railways. However, they still continue on some important railways, such as the Indian Railways, besides the heritage railways.

Origin
Railways were a formalised development of industrial tramways, which had found need on occasions to add additional braking capacity by adding an empty truck to the rear of a group of tramcars. This allowed the "locomotive" — often a cableway powered by a steam engine at the surface — to operate both safely and, more importantly, at higher speed.

The first railways, such as the pioneering Liverpool and Manchester Railway of 1830, used a version of the tramways buffer and chain coupling, termed a screw-coupling. Vehicles are coupled by hand using a hook and links with a turnbuckle-like device that draws the vehicles together. Vehicles have buffers, one at each corner on the ends, which are pulled together and compressed by the coupling device. With no continuous brake across the entire train, the whole train was reliant on the braking capacity of the locomotive, and train lengths were restricted.

To allow for longer trains, early railway companies from the 1840s onwards began replicating industrial tramway practises, by adding "break vans". The term was derived from their name on the industrial tramways, in which they controlled the (residual) train if there was a "break" in the linkage to the locomotive. Early railway couplings had been found to be prone to breakages. The term was only replaced by "brake van" from the 1870s onwards.

The brake van was marshalled at the rear of the train, and served two purposes:

Provided additional braking for 'unfitted' goods trains
Put a man (the guard) at the rear of the train, who could take action in the event of a breakdown or accident

While the UK railway system persisted until post-nationalisation in 1948 with "unfitted" (discontinuously braked) trains and loose couplings (the final unfitted trains ran in the 1990s), other systems, such as the North American adoption of the Janney coupler, overcame the same railway safety issues in a different manner.

The guard's job

On unfitted trains, the brake van has several purposes, and hence jobs for the guard.

Firstly, and most importantly, the guard would use the brake van's brakes to assist with keeping the train under control on downwards gradients and whenever he could see that the locomotive's crew was attempting to slow the train. Route knowledge would allow the guard to initiate the braking before the driver. To aid in this, signalling regulations mandated that signals be left at clear until the entirety of a train (including guard's van) had passed, as the guard would immediately apply brakes upon seeing a signal at danger.

Secondly, the wheel handbrake could be screwed down to keep the loose screw couplings taut between unfitted wagons, to minimise the risk of snapped broken couplings from the locomotive "snatching" or jerking, which was particularly a problem as locomotives became more powerful. As breaking couplings on unfitted trains when starting were a fairly common occurrence, train crews were given specific instruction. Upon starting a freight train, rules mandated the footplate crew to look back on their train towards the brake van, waiting for the guard to signal (by flag or lamp) that the entire train was moving and all couplings were taut, before accelerating to higher speeds.

A later job of the guard was the provision of side lamps on brake vans. The white lamp is the tail lamp, whilst the grey lamps are the side lamps, along with the standard tail lamp (showing red to the rear and sides) required on the rear of every train. The side lamps showed a white light towards the front and a red light to the side/rear. The front-facing lamps were an indication to the locomotive crew that the train was still complete, whilst the provision of extra red lights to the rear was an additional safety measure. Due to the very low chance of all three lights being out at once, it was stipulated that a freight train passing without any lamps on the rear had split and that the rear portion was potentially running away. These side lamps were used on passenger trains before the adoption of continuous brakes on such trains.

A further purpose for these side lamps was that, as the red indication was provided by a shade that could be removed by sliding out of the top of the lamp, a white light could be shown to the rear of the train. This could be used to indicate to a train on a parallel faster line that the brake van showing the white light was travelling in the same direction but on another line, presenting no danger of a collision. The white lamp would be on the side closest to the faster running line, and would be deployed on relief or slow lines where faster running lines ran parallel with no more than one other line intervening, or on loops or refuge sidings next to running lines. In an emergency, the guard could attract the attention of other railway staff by reversing these side lights, so that red lights shone forward to alert the loco crew, or any other railway staff that saw them.

Country overview

Great Britain

Past

In Great Britain, freight trains without a continuous train braking system in either the whole train or the rearmost section of the train ("unfitted" or "partly fitted", respectively in UK railway parlance) were still prevalent in the 1970s, but mostly eliminated by the 1980s.

Early brake vans were heavily weighted, adapted open freight wagons, equipped with an externally mounted hand-operated brake acting on all four wheels. The term brake van began to be adopted from the 1870s onwards, when bespoke designed vehicles had a specific hut added to house the guard away from the weather. In keeping with tradition, most brake vans had an open area, but from the 1870s onwards this "veranda" became in part enclosed through the addition of a roof. Some vans became fully enclosed, but were equipped at each end with windows to allow the guard to view the entire train.

All of the operating equipment, specifically the brakes and sandboxes to improve traction, were located in the open area of the brake van. Brakes were normally controlled using a hand wheel mounted within the veranda, although some early designs continued with an externally mounted shaft. To improve the guard's visibility, many were fitted with look-outs on the roof, but side look-outs (termed "duckets") were the more common. The North Eastern Railway, Great Central Railway, London, Brighton and South Coast Railway and the Lancashire and Yorkshire Railway all built brake vans with a raised look-out at one end of the roof.

Two issues always added to brake power, the purpose of a brake van: wheels, and weight. Hence, many companies tried both approaches to improve their brake vans. Brake vans often had a significant amount of ballast, in the form of concrete, cast iron or water tanks built into their structure, to increase the available braking effort.

Whilst most brake vans had two axles with four wheels, many railway companies built brake vans with three axles and six wheels. The Great Northern Railway built a few eight-wheelers for very heavy coal trains, the only rigid eight-wheeler brake vans built in the UK. In the 1930s, the London, Midland and Scottish Railway (LMS) built three bespoke twin-bogied vans (four axles, eight wheels), for use on a particular branch line, where they replaced pairs of four-wheeled vans. The design covered the entire chassis length, with two extended verandas on either side of a cabin equipped with twin duckets.

To improve braking further, some LMS and LNER brake vans were fitted with vacuum brakes in addition to their normal brake, which could be operated by the guard. Almost all War Department brake vans were fitted with vacuum cylinders, as they were exclusively used on ammunition trains. The Southern Railway built some twin-bogie brake vans on redundant electric locomotive chassis, termed the "Queen Mary" brake vans. Designed for high speed operation on milk and parcels trains rather than stopping power, they had a lengthened cabin, but did not cover the entire twin-bogie chassis.

Equipment carried aboard the brake van, which had to be checked by the guard before the train's departure, consisted of a shunting pole (a wooden pole about 6 feet long with a twisted hook on the end which was used to couple and uncouple 3-link and instanter couplings without the guard having to position himself dangerously in between the vehicles), a brake stick (imagine a square ended baseball bat; it was used to lever down the handbrakes of wagons by placing it under the solebar and applying downward pressure), paraffin for the lamps, usually in an old milk bottle, and two pairs of track circuit clips (these are clips that fit over the rail and are connected by a length of wire more than 4 feet 8 and a half inches long; they are clipped over both rails of a track-circuited line so as to short circuit the track and indicate to the signalman that a train is occupying that section; they would be used in the event of an accident in which other running lines were fouled and trains on them had to be stopped as a matter of great urgency). He would also check that the tail and side lamps were carried, filled, trimmed, and lit at night, during fog or falling snow, or if the train is to run through any tunnel in which lamps are required. These checks were part of the guard's train preparation duties, and his responsibility. The guard would, also at this time, ensure that the van carried coal and kindling to light the stove fire, even in summer if the train was to be relieved by another crew who might have to work into the cool of evening or night. It was common for guards to carry old newspapers with which to stop up any draughts that made their presence felt at speed; partly fitted freight trains might run up to 60 mph.

Other features of the van's interior would be a coal stove for the guard's heating and cooking needs, above which was a rail with hooks on for the purpose of drying wet clothing. Furniture would consist of padded seating, with pads at shoulder height to protect the guard from the inevitable jolts and jerks ('snatches') of freight work, at the duckets; the guard would sit here for protection while the train was moving, unless absolutely necessary. He could reach the brake wheel from that position. This padded seat would be on top of a bench locker that stretched the entire side of one side of the van and half of the other (the side which the stove). A further padded seat was provided at the end of this bench locker where there was a small desk for the guard to perform whatever written work was necessary

Decline
In 1968, the requirement for fully fitted freight trains to end with a guard's van was lifted. By this time, nearly all steam locomotives had been withdrawn and most of the standard-design British Railways diesel and electric locomotives which replaced them had cabs at both ends. The guard was therefore allowed to ride in the rearmost locomotive cab, which gave a good view of the whole train. There being in consequence no operational need for so many brake vans, many types were withdrawn. In 1985, the rail unions agreed to single-man operation of some freight services, and for the first time in over 150 years trains were operated without a guard on board. Brake vans continued to be required, nevertheless, on trains carrying dangerous chemicals until the late 1990s.

Present
The requirement to use brake vans on trains in Great Britain was formally removed in 2021 with changes to the formal rules for freight train operation (colloquially known as the 'White Pages').

In the years immediately prior to that, brake vans were only deemed necessary by HM Railway Inspectorate or Network Rail in certain special cases, for example in trains with unusual cargoes or track maintenance trains, or when one of the few single-cabbed locomotives are used, such as the British Rail Class 20. 
The nearest equivalent to a brake van still in use on main-line British railways is the driving van trailer (DVT), which is used on locomotive-hauled trains to control the locomotive from the other end of the train in a push-pull configuration, removing the need for the locomotive to run around its train at termini. Although the DVT has braking capability of its own, this is incidental, as the vehicle's primary purpose is to allow the train to be driven from the opposite end of the train from the locomotive, as well as to provide accommodation for bulky luggage.

Brake vans are a common sight on many heritage railways. On occasion, multiple brake vans will be coupled together in what is known as a "brake van special" for people to ride in.

Australia 
In Australia, brake vans (or guard's vans; both terms were in common use) were often also used for carrying parcels and light freight, and usually had large compartments and loading doors for such items. Some of the larger vans also included a compartment for passengers travelling on goods services or drovers travelling with their livestock.

Cane railways 
Sugar cane railways in Queensland sometimes have radio-controlled brake vans. The wagons in these trains are unfitted and have no continuous brake pipes.

India

On Indian Railways, brake vans are still in use to a great extent on freight or goods trains and in some passenger trains.

The brake van in the passenger trains (usually the first and last coaches in the train) is a part of a coach and consists of an enclosed room/cabin with two small seats faced opposite to each other, one seat having the writing table for the guard to assist writing and working his train, the opposite seat being a spare. The van also has a small lavatory. A special feature of the passenger brake van is a small dog box where passengers can carry their pets along with them while they travel in the same train in a different coach. The guard generally remains responsible for the water and pet food while the train is moving, and there are features to the dog box to allow the same. The brake van also contains a stretcher, an emergency train lighting box, and a stand to hold the lamp signal during the night. The vacuum or air pressure gauge is hosted in front of the guard's seat with a lever to operate it in case of emergency. The hand brake can be used in case of high emergency. The remaining part of the coach consists of space for carrying parcels and small goods. It also has seating for ladies or for the disabled (wheelchair friendly).

The goods brake van is less attractive, is generally the last vehicle on the train, open on both sides, and does not necessarily have interior lighting/lamps, but it does house a small WC lavatory seat for the guards, owing to their long hours on freight trains. The van is less secure and has fewer features than the passenger brake van. Eight-wheeled brake vans were introduced recently to improve the riding comfort for the guards.

Passenger brake van

A passenger brake van was a combine car originally designed to serve the same purpose as a goods brake van, but, when continuous brakes became standard on passenger trains, its use changed. The van may have equipment for the application of continuous brakes in an emergency if fitted alongside the hand brake for when the train is parked without a locomotive present. The vehicle also provides a compartment for the guard, a luggage compartment, and sometimes passenger accommodation, as well.

Examples
Examples of British passenger brake vans include:

 Brake Gangwayed
 Brake Standard Open
 Brake Standard Open (Micro-Buffet)

Support coaches
In the UK, converted British Railways Mark 1 passenger brake vans are used as the basis for preserved steam locomotive support coaches.

See also
Baggage car/luggage van
Brakeman's cabin
Brake tender
Caboose
 Crew car

References

External links

 LMS brake van
 GWR brake van
 LNWR brake van

Freight rolling stock
British railway wagons
+

de:Begleitwagen